Dufaux is a surname. It is most popular in Belgium, northeastern and southern France, and Switzerland.

The etymology is thought to be from Latin fagus ("beech") via Old French fou, fau.

People with the surname Dufaux

Armand Dufaux (1883-1941), Swiss aviation pioneer
Frederic Dufaux, French engineer
Georges Dufaux (1927-2008), Canadian cinematographer
Gilles Dufaux (b. 1994), Swiss sport shooter
Guy Dufaux (b. 1943), Canadian cinematographer
Henri Dufaux (1879-1980), aviation pioneer, brother of Armand
Irene Dufaux (b. 1960), Swiss sport shooter
Jean Dufaux (b. 1949), Belgian comic book writer
Laurent Dufaux (b. 1969), bicyclist
Louis Dufaux (1931-2011), French Roman Catholic bishop
Natacha Dufaux, Canadian film editor
Pierre-Alain Dufaux (b. 1949), Swiss sport shooter

See also
 Faux (surname)

References

French-language surnames
Surnames of Belgian origin